Nepenthes zygon is a tropical pitcher plant native to the Philippines. The type specimen originates from a plant cultivated at the Royal Botanic Gardens, Kew, grown from seed collected in 1997 by Robert Cantley on Mount Pasian, Mindanao.

References

 Rowson, D. 2015. Caught in a trap. The Biologist 62(2): 12–14. 

Carnivorous plants of Asia
zygon
Endemic flora of the Philippines
Flora of Mindanao
Plants described in 2014
Taxa named by Martin Cheek
Taxa named by Matthew Jebb